Upper Wage Rural LLG a local-level government (LLG) of Koroba-Kopiago District in Hela Province, Papua New Guinea.

Wards
08. Homaria
09. Tuya
10. Mabia
11. Tengo
14. Tabala
15. Wambia
16. Ugu 1
17. Ugu 2
18. Yanagere
19. Yuhoma
20. Yongo
27. Ariaka
28. Panduaga 1
29. Panduaga 2/Piangai
30. Tawanda
31. Liuliu
32. Tundaka
33. Yongale
34. Margarima
35. Pipi
36. Kungu

References 

Local-level governments of Hela Province